"Michelle" is the seventh episode of the first series of the British teen drama Skins. It was written by Bryan Elsley and directed by Minkie Spiro. It premiered on E4 on 8 March 2007. It is told from the point of view of one of the main character Michelle Richardson.

Plot

Michelle breaks up with Tony for not confessing to cheating on her with Maxxie. Despite their argument, Tony is confident that she will eventually forgive him.

Later, Angie attempts to avoid Chris by hiding in a broom cupboard where she finds Michelle, drunk on vodka. The two have coffee and Michelle confides in her about her woes. Chris finds them and Angie agrees to give them both a ride home. After dropping off Michelle, Angie attempts to end her affair with Chris but they end up having sex in her car. At Michelle's home, her mother, Anna, dismisses her problems while her stepfather, Malcolm, criticizes Michelle.

At school, Tony reads aloud an essay about the role of sex in relationships, embarrassing Michelle. Angie berates him for his cruelty and Maxxie confesses to the group that Tony performed fellatio on him on the Russia trip. Jal informs Michelle about Tony's various filings with other girls during their relationship, including with Abigail Stock. Michelle picks a fight with Abigail in front of her friends, but Abigail's brother, Josh, breaks up the fight. He takes an interest in Michelle, but she attempts to use Sid as a rebound instead. However, Sid realizes he cannot have sex with Michelle because he is in love with Cassie. Sid's father walks in on them hugging on the bed together and is pleased to see that Sid is not gay.

He and Michelle go to visit Cassie at the psychiatric hospital, but he is dismayed to find out that Cassie has a new boyfriend and is now celibate. At the hospital, Michelle runs into Josh, and he asks her out. Michelle happily accepts, but her happiness is short-lived when she gets into another argument at home with her stepfather.

On her date with Josh, Michelle learns that he is mentally unstable and is on mood stabilizers. However, she has sex with him and excitedly makes plans to see him again. Back at home, Michelle finds Malcolm preparing to leave her mother and cynically notes that it is her mother's shortest marriage yet. Meanwhile, Tony finally realizes Michelle is moving on from him and devises a plan to win her back. He meets up with Abigail and convinces her to let him take nude photos of her. He then has a friend steal Josh's mobile phone. Tony then uploads the nude photos onto it and sends the photos to Josh's contact list, including Michelle. Michelle is horrified and dumps Josh because she believes he is too crazy to date. Back at home, she finds her mother sobbing over Malcolm's desertion and comforts her.

To cheer herself up over Josh, Michelle and Jal head to the bars together where they bump into Malcolm. He admits that he is contemplating returning, and Michelle encourages him to do so and offers him some advice.

At her house, Michelle bumps into Tony, who tells her he is sorry and that he loves her. He begs her to take him back and promises to change. Though she forgives him, she firmly refuses to take him back, saying she'll 'see him around'.

Main cast
 April Pearson as Michelle Richardson
 Nicholas Hoult as Tony Stonem
 Larissa Wilson as Jal Fazer
 Mitch Hewer as Maxxie Oliver
 Joe Dempsie as Chris Miles
 Mike Bailey as Sid Jenkins
 Hannah Murray as Cassie Ainsworth
 Dev Patel as Anwar Kharral

Arc significance and continuity

The episode reveals some facts about Michelle's home life. Michelle and Malcolm do not get on well. She is irritated by his childish mannerisms, such as slurping milk from his breakfast cereal. He and Anna bicker often and he criticises her about her "big arse". Michelle's mother, Anna is often too busy to listen to Michelle; their relationship seems relatively good, but they argue over Anna's choice in husbands. Michelle's series two feature will focus more significantly on her relationship with her father, who is unseen in this episode.

Tony and Michelle break up in this episode, which leads to the group isolating Tony in favour of Michelle in the next episode. A number of revelations also change the series' dynamics to set up for the finale.
 Sid realises he has fallen in love with Cassie, and out of love with Michelle.
 Angie and Chris are now in a relationship, which Angie wishes to keep secret, but Chris wishes to be honest about it.
 The group learn about Tony's attempt at seducing Maxxie in Russia.

Tony recites Romeo and Juilet to Michelle's window. This is later portrayed in a series 5 episode of "Grace", episode 7 when Rich serenades to grace using the line "It is the east and Juliet is the sun." which Tony uses but this time Rich climbs up to Grace's room reciting different parts of the scene in the play.

Soundtrack
 Kapsburger by Clogs
 Red Hot Mama by Parliament
 Tender to the Blues by James Yorkston
 The One You Really Love by The Magnetic Fields
 Dart for my Sweetheart by Archie Bronson Outfit
 The First Day of my Life by Bright Eyes
 Black Swan by Thom Yorke
 May You Never by John Martyn
Note: The music tracks listed above only refer to the music featured in the episode's initial airing. Many of the music tracks featured in this episode have been substituted for alternative tracks either for the BBC America airing or for both the US and UK home media release of Series 1.

References

External links 
 Watch "Michelle" on 4od
 Michelle at e4.com/skins
 Skins on Internet Movie DataBase

2007 British television episodes
Skins (British TV series) episodes